26 Andromedae, abbreviated 26 And, is a binary star system in the constellation Andromeda. 26 Andromedae is the Flamsteed designation. It has a combined apparent visual magnitude of 6.10, which is near the lower limit of visibility to the naked eye. At that distance, the visual magnitude of the stars is diminished from an extinction of 0.04 due to interstellar dust. The system is moving further from the Earth with a heliocentric radial velocity of +3.3 km/s.

The magnitude 6.11 primary, component A, is a B-type main-sequence star with a stellar classification of B8 V. The star has 3.54 times the mass of the Sun and 3.76 times the Sun's radius.

It is an F-type main-sequence star with a class of F3 V that shows an unexplained long term variability.

One of the components of this system displays a slight photometric variation with a period of 3.16 days. This may be caused by pulsation or an ellipsoidal variation. This system's X-ray emission hasn't been detected yet, with an upper limit of Lx < 29.79 erg/s.

References

External links
 Image 26 Andromedae

B-type main-sequence stars
F-type main-sequence stars
Spectroscopic binaries
Suspected variables
Circumstellar disks
Andromeda (constellation)
Durchmusterung objects
Andromedae, 26
001438
001501
0070